Justin Morgan may refer to:
 Justin Morgan (1747–1798), American horse breeder and composer
 Justin Morgan (rugby league) (born 1975), Australian and Welsh rugby player
 Justin C. Morgan (1900–1959), U.S. federal judge
 Justin Morgan (Home and Away), a fictional character from the Australian soap opera Home and Away